John Turitzin is a corporate executive currently working at Marvel Entertainment.

Life
John Turitzin was approximately born in 1955. He attended and graduated from Earlham College.  In 1981, he graduated from NYU School of Law and Princeton University with a master's degree in public affairs.

After graduating in 1981, he became an associate of Cahill Gordon & Reindel in New York.  Later, he worked at the Battle Fowler firm becoming a partner there.  In 2000, the Battle Fowler firm merged into Paul Hastings Janofsky & Walker and he became Marvel Enterprises' outside counsel.

In February 2006, he was appointed Chief Administrative Officer. As of September 2006, Turitizin was appointed Executive Vice President, Office of the Chief Executive together with David Maisel, and Isaac Perlmutter (CEO).

References

External links
Profile at Bloomberg Business

Living people
Earlham College alumni
1955 births
Marvel Entertainment people
Princeton School of Public and International Affairs alumni
New York University School of Law alumni
People associated with Cahill Gordon & Reindel